Freda Marston (1895-1949) was a British painter and printmaker.

Biography 
Marston née Clulow was born on 22 October 1895 at Hampstead in north London. Between 1916 and 1920, she studied at the Regent Street Polytechnic School of Art where she was taught by Harry Watson and Terrick Williams. Marston exhibited at the Royal Academy in London, with the Royal Society of British Artists and the Fine Art Society. She was married to the painter Reginald St Clair Marston and lived for a time at Robertsbridge in Surrey. She was commissioned by London, Midland and Scottish Railway and  British Railways to produce carriage prints and examples of her work are held in public collections in Eastbourne and Stoke-on-Trent. Marston died on 27 March 1949.

Gallery

References

External links

 

1895 births
1949 deaths
20th-century English painters
20th-century English women artists
Alumni of the University of Westminster
English women painters
Painters from London
People from Hampstead
British railway artists